Marco Friedrich (born 16 February 1998) is an Austrian cyclist, who currently rides for UCI Continental team . He was selected to compete in the road race at the 2020 UCI Road World Championships.

Major results
2015
 3rd Time trial, National Junior Road Championships
2016
 2nd Time trial, National Junior Road Championships
2017
 1st  Mountains classification Gemenc Grand Prix
 3rd Time trial, National Under-23 Road Championships
2018
 3rd Time trial, National Under-23 Road Championships
2020
 3rd Time trial, National Under-23 Road Championships

References

External links

1998 births
Living people
Austrian male cyclists
People from Voitsberg District
Sportspeople from Styria